This is a list of players of American football who died while still on a team roster. Included are players in professional and college football who have died of any cause. For professional football players, the most common cause of death is vehicle crashes. For college players, the most common cause of death is in-game and practice injuries. Each player is listed with the team to which he was assigned at the time of his death, rather than the team with which he spent most of his career. Players who were free agents at the time of their death are not listed.

National Football League

† Davis was under contract when he died though did not play in a game due to his illness.
†† Johnson was injured in a pre-season game and did not play in a regular season game.

Arena Football League and af2
 Johnathan Goddard, 27, Colorado Crush, defensive end, motorcycle crash (2008)
Al Lucas, 26, Los Angeles Avengers, defensive tackle, in-game neck injury (2005)
Justin Skaggs, 28, Utah Blaze, quarterback, stage III oligodendroglioma brain cancer (2007)
Johnie Kirton, 26, San Jose SaberCats, running back, methadone toxicity/unknown (2012)
Julian Yearwood, 31, Bakersfield Blitz, fullback/linebacker, clogged arteries (2003)
Chandler Williams, 27, Tampa Bay Storm, wide receiver, cardiac arrest (2013)

Canadian Football League

Continental Football League
Glen Hepburn, 29, two-way end, Omaha Mustangs, injuries sustained during a game (1968)

XFL (2001 league)
Donald Sellers, 26, WR, Las Vegas Outlaws, car crash (2001)
Troy Stark, 28, OL, New York/New Jersey Hitmen, complications from surgery (2001)

XFL (2020 league)
Chris Brown, 24, OL, DC Defenders, drowned (2021)

USFL (2022 league)
Jessie Lemonier, 25, LB, Birmingham Stallions, cause not released (2023)

College

Team vehicle and plane crashes
Purdue: 14 members of football team were killed in a railroad collision (1903).
Northeastern Oklahoma A&M: 5 football players were killed in a head-on highway crash (1966).
Marshall: 37 members died in an airplane crash (1970).
Wichita State: most of the starting players and coaches, 31 in total, died in an airplane crash (1970).
Cal Poly Mustangs football team: 16 players and 6 others died in an airplane crash (1960).
Southwestern Oklahoma State: 4 football players were killed in a car crash (1996).

See also
 Sudden cardiac death of athletes
 List of National Football League players who died in wars

References

Died
American football